Peddie (Xhosa: iNgqushwa) is a town in the Ngqushwa Local Municipality within the Amathole District Municipality in the Eastern Cape province of South Africa.

The town is situated 55 km south-west of Qonce and 67 km east of Makhanda. It developed from a frontier post established in 1835 and named Fort Peddie, and became a municipality in 1905. Named after Lieutenant-Colonel John Peddie (died 1840), who led the 72nd Highlanders against the Xhosa in the Sixth Frontier War.

A large provincial hospital on the outskirts of Peddie is named Nompumelelo Hospital.

References

Populated places in the Ngqushwa Local Municipality